Presidential elections were held in the Maldives in September 1973. The election took the form of a referendum on the candidacy of incumbent President Ibrahim Nasir, who was re-elected.

Background
Nasir had originally been elected for a four-year term in 1968. However, in 1972 a constitutional amendment was passed by the Majlis to extend the presidential term to five years.

The constitution required that the President be selected by the Majlis and then their candidacy confirmed through a referendum.

References

Maldives
Presidential election
Presidential elections in the Maldives
Referendums in the Maldives
Maldives
Single-candidate elections
Maldivian presidential election
Election and referendum articles with incomplete results